A National Crisis Management Committee is a committee set up by the Government of India in the wake of a natural calamity for effective coordination and implementation of relief measures and operations. It is headed by Cabinet Secretary. On the constitution of such a committee, the Agriculture Secretary shall provide all necessary information to and seek directions. A National Crisis Management Committee(NCMC) has been constituted in the Cabinet Secretariat. The composition of the committee is as under:-
	 Cabinet Secretary Chairman,
	 Secretary to Prime Minister Member,
	 Secretary (MHA) Member,
	 Secretary (MCD) Member,
	 Director (IB) Member,
	 Secretary (R&AW) Member,
	 Secretary (Agri & Coopn.) Co-opted Member,
	 An officer of Cabinet Secretariat. Convenor

Sources 
 Contingency Action Plan - National Policy

References

Government of India